Federal Route 116, or Jalan Chandekura and Jalan Kedawang, is a major federal road in Langkawi Island, Kedah, Malaysia.

Features

At most sections, the Federal Route 116 was built under the JKR R5 road standard, allowing maximum speed limit of up to 90 km/h.

List of junctions and town

References

Malaysian Federal Roads
Roads in Langkawi